The Hellenic State (also translated as Greek State) was the collaborationist government of Greece during the country's occupation by the Axis powers in the Second World War.

Establishment

After the fall of Greece, General Georgios Tsolakoglou was appointed Prime minister of the new Greek government on April 30, 1941. As King George II had left the country with the legitimate Greek government-in-exile, the new regime avoided all reference to the Greek monarchy and used Hellenic State as the country's official, generic, name. The collaborationist regime lacked a precise political definition, although Tsolakoglou, a republican officer, considered the Axis occupation as an opportunity to abolish the monarchy, and announced its end upon taking office. The existence of a native Greek government was considered necessary by the Axis powers, in order to give some appearance of legitimacy to their occupation, although it was never given more than an ancillary role. The country's infrastructure had been ruined by the war. Raw materials and foodstuffs were requisitioned, and the government was forced to pay the cost of the occupation, giving rise to inflation, further exacerbated by a "war loan" Greece was forced to grant to Nazi Germany. Requisitions, together with the Allied blockade of Greece, resulted in the Great Famine (Greek: Μεγάλος Λιμός) during the winter of 1941–42, which caused the deaths of an estimated 300,000 people.

Government and politics
The regime was first led by Georgios Tsolakoglou, the general who signed the unconditional surrender of the Hellenic Army to the Germans. However, he was sacked a year later and replaced by Konstantinos Logothetopoulos, who himself was sacked in 1943. The last prime minister of the Hellenic State was Ioannis Rallis, who led the collaborationist regime until its dissolution in 1944. Georgios Bakos, a Greek Army major general, served as the minister of national defense, a position which Rallis had previously held in the regime. The Hellenic State was widely viewed as a puppet government and was unpopular with the Greek people.

Administrative divisions
Administratively, the Hellenic State was divided into a number of prefectures.

Decline and fall
The Hellenic State lacked the infrastructure and latitude for action to face the great difficulties of the Occupation period; it was also devoid of any political legitimacy, and was widely considered a puppet government. Tsolakoglou demanded greater political rights for his government, and soon threatened to resign. The proclamation of a mandatory work service in Germany for Greek citizens proved widely unpopular and hastened the fall of Tsolakoglou; on 17 November 1942, he was sacked and replaced by his deputy, Konstantinos Logothetopoulos. The new government announced that 80,000 Greek citizens were to be sent to Germany. This led to widespread demonstrations and strikes, and the decision was eventually revoked. Logothetopoulos, who had protested against the measures taken by the Axis occupation authorities, was himself sacked on 6 April 1943. Against the wishes of the Italians, who favored Finance Minister Sotirios Gotzamanis, he was replaced by Ioannis Rallis, a monarchist politician. Rallis, who was looking beyond the German withdrawal from Greece to the restoration of the post-war political order, and who was alarmed by the growth of the mostly Communist-dominated Greek resistance, obtained German consent for the creation of the Security Battalions, armed formations that were used in anti-partisan offensives.

Military

The collaborationist regime under Rallis set up Security Battalions, units of soldiers that aided the German Army in fighting the resistance. They are known for committing atrocities against the civilian population. An officer named Georgios Bakos served as the minister of national defense.

Exile and trial
During September 1944, after the liberation of Greece, a new collaborationist government was established at Vienna, formed by former collaborationist ministers. It was headed by the former collaborationist minister Ektor Tsironikos. The collaborationist Greek government ceased to exist after the withdrawal of German forces and the liberation of the country in October 1944. Tsolakoglou, Rallis and Logothetopoulos (in Germany, where he had escaped to) were all arrested, along with hundreds of other collaborationists. The restored government set up the Trials of Collaborationists (I Diki ton Dosilogon) to judge collaborators,. During 1945, Tsironikos was tried and sentenced to death. On 10 May 1945, he was arrested in Vienna by Allied forces and sent to Greece, where he was imprisoned. The government did not fulfil its promise to make major efforts to punish collaborators; this contributed to the escalation of political enmities in Greece, which in turn played a part in the outbreak of the Greek civil war.

References

External links 
German banknotes circulated only in Greece during the occupation (1941–1944) 

Client states of Nazi Germany

1940s in Greek politics
Fascism in Greece
Greek collaborators with Nazi Germany
States and territories established in 1941
1941 establishments in Greece
States and territories disestablished in 1944
1944 disestablishments in Greece